Wall spider is the common name for members of the genus Oecobius.  The members of these several species are all very small spiders that make small flat webs over crevices in walls and in similar spaces.  They possess an organ called a cribellum, which is a kind of comb-like device used to separate fibers of silk drawn from its spinnerets into many extremely fine fibers.  Those fibers are so small in diameter that prey insects easily become entangled in them. The spiders then bite them before they can get away.

One cosmopolitan species is O. navus (sometimes also called O. annulipes).

One species of interest is Oecobius civitas. When a spider enters the home of another spider, rather than defend itself, the resident leaves to find another one.

Species
 Oecobius achimota Shear & Benoit, 1974 (Ghana)
 Oecobius aculeatus Wunderlich, 1987 (Canary Is.)
 Oecobius affinis O. P.-Cambridge, 1872 (Syria, Jordan)
 Oecobius agaetensis Wunderlich, 1992 (Canary Is.)
 Oecobius albipunctatus O. P.-Cambridge, 1872 (Syria)
 Oecobius alhoutyae Wunderlich, 1995 (Kuwait)
 Oecobius amboseli Shear & Benoit, 1974 (Egypt, Kenya, Uganda)
 Oecobius annulipes Lucas, 1846 (Algeria)
 Oecobius ashmolei Wunderlich, 1992 (Canary Is.)
 Oecobius beatus Gertsch & Davis, 1937 (Mexico)
 Oecobius bracae Shear, 1970 (Mexico)
 Oecobius caesaris Wunderlich, 1987 (Canary Is., Azores)
 Oecobius cambridgei Wunderlich, 1995 (Lebanon)
 Oecobius camposi Wunderlich, 1992 (Canary Is.)
 Oecobius cellariorum (Dugès, 1836)  (Cosmopolitan)
 Oecobius chiasma Barman, 1978 (India)
 Oecobius civitas Shear, 1970 (Mexico)
 Oecobius concinnus Simon, 1893 (USA to Brazil, Galapagos Is. (elsewhere, introduced))
 Oecobius culiacanensis Shear, 1970 (Mexico)
 Oecobius cumbrecita Wunderlich, 1987 (Canary Is.)
 Oecobius depressus Wunderlich, 1987 (Canary Is.)
 Oecobius dolosus Wunderlich, 1987 (Canary Is.)
 Oecobius doryphorus Schmidt, 1977 (Canary Is.)
 Oecobius erjosensis Wunderlich, 1992 (Canary Is.)
 Oecobius formosensis (Kishida, 1943) (Taiwan)
 Oecobius fortaleza Wunderlich, 1992 (Canary Is.)
 Oecobius fuerterotensis Wunderlich, 1992 (Canary Is.)
 Oecobius furcula Wunderlich, 1992 (Canary Is.)
 Oecobius gomerensis Wunderlich, 1979 (Canary Is.)
 Oecobius hayensis Wunderlich, 1992 (Canary Is.)
 Oecobius hidalgoensis Wunderlich, 1992 (Canary Is.)
 Oecobius hierroensis Wunderlich, 1987 (Canary Is.)
 Oecobius hoffmannae Jiménez & Llinas, 2005 (Mexico)
 Oecobius idolator Shear & Benoit, 1974 (Burkina Faso)
 Oecobius iguestensis Wunderlich, 1992 (Canary Is.)
 Oecobius incertus Wunderlich, 1995 (North Africa)
 Oecobius infierno Wunderlich, 1987 (Canary Is.)
 Oecobius interpellator Shear, 1970 (USA)
 Oecobius isolatoides Shear, 1970 (USA, Mexico)
 Oecobius isolatus Chamberlin, 1924 (USA, Mexico)
 Oecobius juangarcia Shear, 1970 (Mexico)
 Oecobius lampeli Wunderlich, 1987 (Canary Is.)
 Oecobius latiscapus Wunderlich, 1992 (Canary Is.)
 Oecobius linguiformis Wunderlich, 1995 (Canary Is.)
 Oecobius longiscapus Wunderlich, 1992 (Canary Is.)
 Oecobius machadoi Wunderlich, 1995 (Portugal, Spain)
 Oecobius maculatus Simon, 1870 (Mediterranean to Azerbaijan)
 Oecobius marathaus Tikader, 1962 (Pantropical)
 Oecobius marcosensis Wunderlich, 1992 (Canary Is.)
 Oecobius maritimus Wunderlich, 1987 (Canary Is.)
 Oecobius minor Kulczyn'ski, 1909 (Azores, Madeira)
 Oecobius nadiae (Spassky, 1936) (Central Asia, China)
 Oecobius navus Blackwall, 1859 (Cosmopolitan)
 Oecobius navus hachijoensis Uyemura, 1965 (Japan)
 Oecobius palmensis Wunderlich, 1987 (Canary Is.)
 Oecobius paolomaculatus Wunderlich, 1995 (Algeria)
 Oecobius pasteuri Berland & Millot, 1940 (West Africa)
 Oecobius persimilis Wunderlich, 1987 (Canary Is.)
 Oecobius petronius Simon, 1890 (Yemen)
 Oecobius piaxtla Shear, 1970 (Mexico)
 Oecobius pinoensis Wunderlich, 1992 (Canary Is.)
 Oecobius przewalskyi Hu & Li, 1987 (Tibet)
 Oecobius pseudodepressus Wunderlich, 1992 (Canary Is.)
 Oecobius putus O. P.-Cambridge, 1876 (Egypt, Sudan to Azerbaijan (USA, introduced))
 Oecobius rhodiensis Kritscher, 1966 (Greece)
 Oecobius rioensis Wunderlich, 1992 (Canary Is.)
 Oecobius rivula Shear, 1970 (Mexico)
 Oecobius rugosus Wunderlich, 1987 (Canary Is.)
 Oecobius sapporensis Saito, 1934 (Japan)
 Oecobius selvagensis Wunderlich, 1995 (Salvages)
 Oecobius sheari Benoit, 1975 (Chad)
 Oecobius similis Kulczyn'ski, 1909 (Madeira, Canary Is., Azores, St. Helena)
 Oecobius sombrero Wunderlich, 1987 (Canary Is.)
 Oecobius tadzhikus Andreeva & Tyschchenko, 1969 (Central Asia)
 Oecobius tasarticoensis Wunderlich, 1992 (Canary Is.)
 Oecobius teliger O. P.-Cambridge, 1872 (Lebanon)
 Oecobius templi O. P.-Cambridge, 1876 (Egypt, Sudan)
 Oecobius tibesti Shear & Benoit, 1974 (Chad)
 Oecobius trimaculatus O. P.-Cambridge, 1872 (Jordan)
 Oecobius unicoloripes Wunderlich, 1992 (Canary Is.)

References

Further reading
 Santos, A.J. & Gonzaga, M.O. (2003). On the spider genus Oecobius Lucas, 1846 in South America (Araneae, Oecobiidae). Journal of Natural History 37(2):239-252. Abstract

Oecobiidae
Cosmopolitan spiders